= D2.0-Box =

Art gallery in Caserta, Italy

Coordinates: 41.0639°N 14.3661°E

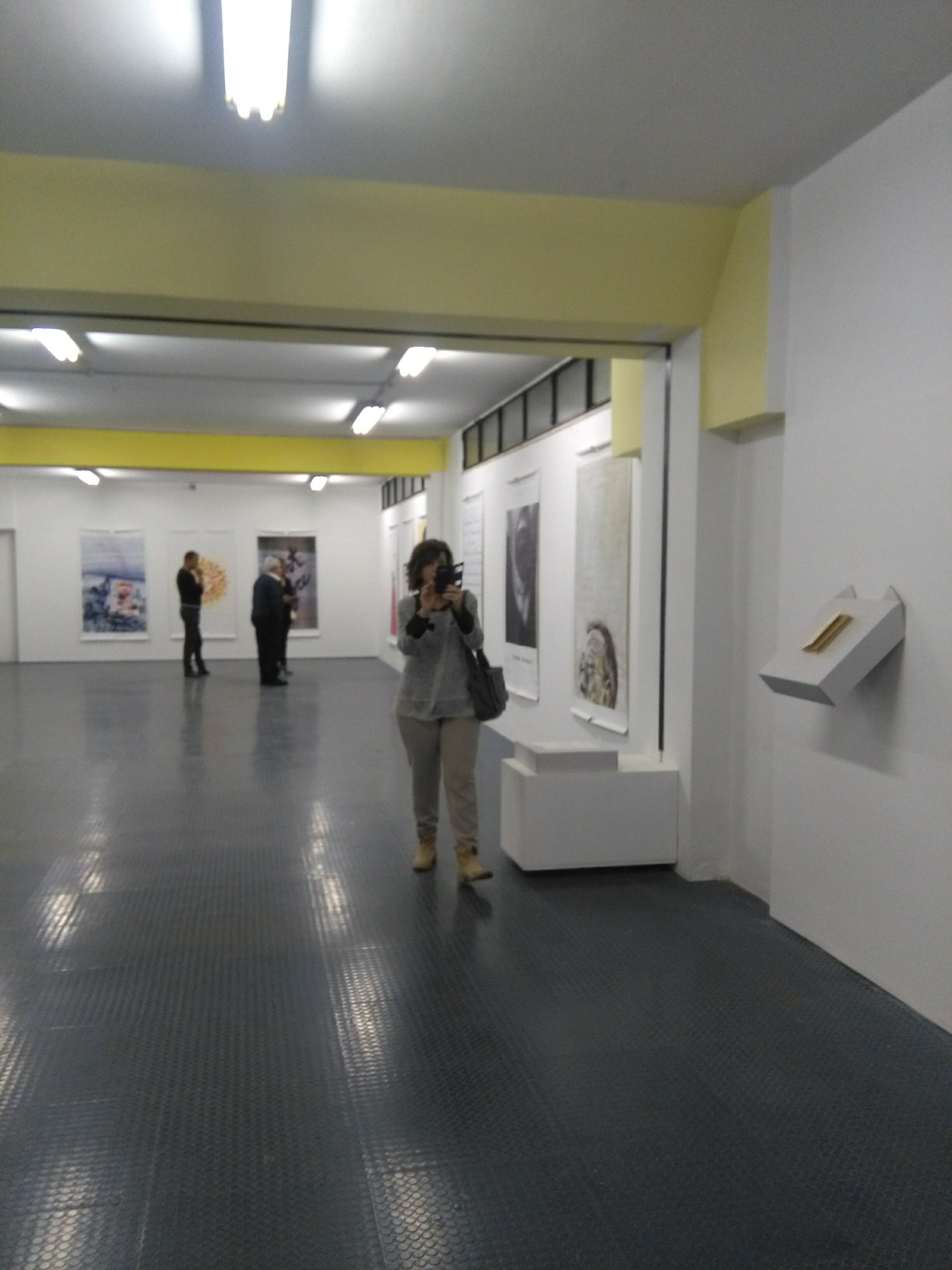
D2.0-Box Reperti 2016

The D2.0-Box is an Italian gallery of modern art and contemporary art in Caserta da Angelo Marino. It is associated with the contemporary art gallery dirartecontemporanea 2.0.

== Exhibitions ==
- Friends.
- Reperti
- Plus Ultra di Mafonso, fifteen years later
- Mario Velocci Spazio.Linea.Suono curated bay Martina Velocci d2.0-box To October 14, 2017
- Trovamento: frammenti di artisti in mostra da D2.0-box. 30 gennaio 2018
- My Work Tells My Story - #1 Chiara Coccorese Maggio 2018
- Daniela Morante My Work Tells My Story Alfabeto Segnico 9 Giugno, 2018
- Gloria Pastore My Work Tells My Story L'Ermafrodita 23 giugno, 2018
- Maria Adele Del Vecchio My Work Tells My Story Mirrors 7 luglio 2018 d2.0-box supervisor Enzo Battarra

== Bibliography ==
- Vincenzo Trione (a cura di) Atlante dell’Arte Contemporanea a Napoli e in Campania 1966 — 2016 scheda Loredana Troise dirartecontemporanea 2.0 gallery pag. 245, Electa 2017 ISBN 978-88-918-1085-4
